Tero Taipale (born 14 December 1972) is a Finnish football player.

References
Guardian Football
Veikkausliiga

External links
 
 

1972 births
Living people
Rovaniemen Palloseura players
Kuopion Palloseura players
Myllykosken Pallo −47 players
Finnish footballers
Finland international footballers
Veikkausliiga players
Association football midfielders
People from Laihia
Sportspeople from Ostrobothnia (region)
FC Santa Claus players